Armin Jäger (born 19 September 1962) is a retired German football player. He spent four seasons in the Bundesliga with VfB Stuttgart and Stuttgarter Kickers.

Honours
 Bundesliga champion: 1983–84
 DFB-Pokal finalist: 1985–86, 1986–87

References

External links
 

1962 births
Living people
German footballers
Bundesliga players
2. Bundesliga players
VfB Stuttgart players
VfB Stuttgart II players
Stuttgarter Kickers players
Association football goalkeepers
People from Ludwigsburg
Sportspeople from Stuttgart (region)
Footballers from Baden-Württemberg